Yamma may refer to:

People
 Isaac Yamma (1940-1990), Australian musician
 Frank Yamma, Australian musician

Other uses
 Yamma Mosque, mosque in Niger
 "Yamma, yamma", song performed in Finnish by Pave Maijanen for the Eurovision Song Contest 1992
 YAMMA Pit Fighting, mixed martial arts promotion in 2008
 Kingdom of Janjero, late 2nd millennium kingdom inside Ethiopia; also known as Yamma
 Lake Yamma Yamma, Queensland, Australia

See also
 Yamnaya culture, or Yamna culture, an early Bronze Age culture